In 1955, the United States FBI, under Director J. Edgar Hoover, continued for a sixth year to maintain a public list of the people it regarded as the Ten Most Wanted Fugitives.

1955 brought a dozen captures and new additions to the list.  Two captures in 1955 were the result of radio broadcasts, another media outlet which was commonly utilized by the publicity department of the FBI to feature its wanted top ten.

1955 fugitives
The "Ten Most Wanted Fugitives" listed by the FBI in 1955 include (in FBI list appearance sequence order):

George Lester Belew
January 4, 1955 #81
Three weeks on the list
George Lester Belew - U.S. prisoner arrested January 24, 1955, at a motel near Champaign, Illinois after the motel owner recognized his photograph on a wanted flyer

Kenneth Darrell Carpenter
January 31, 1955 #82
One week on the list
Kenneth Darrell Carpenter - U.S. prisoner arrested February 4, 1955, near Arlington, Tennessee after an FBI Agent recognized him sitting in the vehicle next to his, as Carpenter reached for the radiodial in his car and the Agent recognized a tattoo of the word "love" on the fingers of his right hand. The Agent radioed for assistance and Carpenter was arrested an hour later.

Flenoy Payne
February 2, 1955 #83
Three years on the list
Flenoy Payne - U.S. prisoner arrested March 11, 1958, in Crittenden County, Arkansas, while working as an itinerant cotton picker and gambler.

Palmer Julius Morset
February 7, 1955 #84
One year on the list
Palmer Julius Morset - U.S. prisoner arrested March 2, 1956, in Indianapolis, Indiana.

Patrick Eugene McDermott
February 9, 1955 #85
Five months on the list
Patrick Eugene McDermott - U.S. prisoner arrested July 19, 1955 when he was recognized by a police officer from an Identification Order while he was working as a local ambulance driver in New York City

Garland William Daniels
February 18, 1955 #86
One month on the list
Garland William Daniels - U.S. prisoner arrested March 29, 1955, in Los Angeles, California after a citizen recognized his photograph in the St. Louis Post-Dispatch newspaper. The arrest was made as Daniels left his home accompanied by his 5-year-old daughter. A suspected narcotics addict, Daniels was in poor physical condition and was given medical treatment before being jailed.

Daniel William O'Connor
April 11, 1955 #87
Three years on the list
Daniel William O'Connor - U.S. prisoner apprehended December 26, 1958, in El Cajon, California during an investigation of a neighborhood theft of a two-wheeled trailer valued
at $15. O'Connor was a neighbor of the victim and was identified by a routine check of his fingerprints. To avoid arrest, O'Connor had dyed his hair red, grew a mustache, added a tattoo and gained 58 pounds.

Jack Harvey Raymond
August 8, 1955 #88
Two months on the list
Jack Harvey Raymond - U.S. prisoner apprehended October 14, 1955, in Denver, Colorado.

Daniel Abram Everhart
August 17, 1955 #89
Two months on the list
Daniel Abram Everhart - U.S. prisoner arrested October 9, 1955, in Denver, Colorado.

Charles Edward Ranels
September 2, 1955 #90
One year on the list
Charles Edward Ranels - U.S. prisoner arrested December 16, 1956, in Pine Bluff, Arkansas after neighbors recognized his
photo on a wanted flyer.

Thurman Arthur Green
October 24, 1955 #91
Four months on the list
Thurman Arthur Green - U.S. prisoner arrested February 16, 1956, in Nashville, Tennessee while home alone in bed recuperating from a toothache, after he had sent his wife to stay with relatives. He told the officers, "I was expecting you yesterday."

John Allen Kendrick
November 2, 1955 #92
One month on the list
John Allen Kendrick - U.S. prisoner arrested December 2, 1955, in Chicago, Illinois.

Joseph James Bagnola
December 19, 1955 #93
One year on the list
Joseph James Bagnola - U.S. prisoner arrested December 30, 1956, in Chicago, Illinois.

Later entries
FBI Ten Most Wanted Fugitives, 2020s
FBI Ten Most Wanted Fugitives, 2010s
FBI Ten Most Wanted Fugitives, 2000s
FBI Ten Most Wanted Fugitives, 1990s
FBI Ten Most Wanted Fugitives, 1980s
FBI Ten Most Wanted Fugitives, 1970s
FBI Ten Most Wanted Fugitives, 1960s
FBI Ten Most Wanted Fugitives, 1950s

External links
Current FBI top ten most wanted fugitives at FBI site
FBI pdf source document listing all Ten Most Wanted year by year (removed by FBI)

 
1955 in the United States